Shoot Me: Youth Part 1 is the third extended play by South Korean band DAY6. It was released by JYP Entertainment on June 26, 2018, and features six original tracks.

Background and release 
On May 14, 2018, it was reported that Day6 will be returning with new music in June and their agency JYP Entertainment stated, "DAY6 is working on their new album, but the exact comeback timing has not been decided yet". On June 11, the agency dropped Day6's 'Schedule Announcement' and revealed that the band would release their third EP titled Shoot Me: Youth Part 1 on June 26.

Subsequently, from June 15 to June 19 motion posters and teaser images of each members were released, followed by unit teaser images on June 20.

On June 25, a teaser of the music video for "Shoot Me" was released on both JYP's official YouTube channel and the group's official V Live channel. On June 26, the EP was released, along with the music video for "Shoot Me".

Composition
The title track is described by Billboard as "bombastic and full of punk rock vibes, with slinking synths thrown in for good measure which "builds itself up to precarious sonic peaks with the “bang bang” of the chorus and then dramatically settles down before working its way once again to a dynamic hook that is fronted by gritty chants."

Promotion 
On June 27, 2018, two hours after the album's release,  a "Comeback Show" was broadcast live on Naver's V LIVE broadcasting site featuring Day6 presenting their new songs.

Day6 promoted the title song "Shoot Me" on various music programs in South Korea including M Countdown and Music Bank.

Track listing

Charts

Release history

References 

2018 EPs
JYP Entertainment EPs
Korean-language EPs
Pop rock EPs
Day6 EPs
IRiver EPs